Wechiau Mosque is a mosque built in the Sudanese architectural style and Djenne style in the village of Wechiau in the Upper West region of Ghana. It has similar features as the Larabanga mosque.

Features 
The mosque has been designed with a mashup of both the Sudanese and the Djenne styles of architecture. It used to have buttresses similar to Sudanic mosques but only one tower left. The interior had columns that were small and are spaced out to support the flat mud roof.

References 

Mosques in Ghana
Upper West Region
Sudano-Sahelian architecture